The Karnataka State Film Awards 1972–73, presented by Government of Karnataka, to felicitate the best of Kannada Cinema released in the year 1972.

Film Awards

Other Awards

References

1972-73